The following is a list of characters from La Comédie humaine a collection of 95 loosely connected novels satirically detailing the life and times of French society in the period after the fall of Napoleon Bonaparte (1769-1821)—namely the period of the Restoration (1815–1830) and the July Monarchy (1830–1848). French novelist and playwright Honoré de Balzac (1799-1850), over the course of these novels, invents a plethora of unique and memorable characters.

Major characters

Recurring characters

 Eugène de Rastignac - student, dandy, financier, politician (appears in 28 works)
 Lucien Chardon de Rubempré (the use of "de Rubempré" is contested) - journalist, parvenu
 Jacques Colin aka Carlos Herrera aka Vautrin aka Trompe-la-Mort - a criminal run away from hard labour
 Camusot - examining magistrate (The Collection of Antiquities, A Commission in Lunacy, Scenes from a Courtesan's Life; his father also appears in A Distinguished Provincial at Paris)
 Blondet, Emile - journalist, man of letters, prefect (The Collection of Antiquities, A Distinguished Provincial at Paris, Scenes from a Courtesan's Life). Compare and contrast with Raoul Nathan.
 Raoul Nathan - in 19 works, writer, politician
 Daniel d'Arthez
 Delphine de Nucingen née Goriot
 Roger de Granville
 Louis Lambert
 la duchesse de Langeais
 la comtesse de Mortsauf
 Jean-Jacques Bixiou - in 19 works, artist
 Joseph Bridau - in 13 works, painter
 Marquis de Ronquerolles - in 20 works
 la comtesse Hugret de Sérisy - in 20 works
 Félix-Amédée de Vandenesse
 Horace Bianchon - in 24 works, doctor
 des Lupeaulx - public servant
 Salon leaders: the Duchesse de Maufrigneuse, the Marquise d'Espard
 Dandies: Maxime de Trailles, Henri de Marsay
 Courtesans: La Torpille (Esther van Gobseck), Madame du Val-Noble
 Financiers: Ferdinand du Tillet, Frédérick de Nucingen (a thin fictionalization of James Rothschild), Keller brothers
 Actresses: Florine (Sophie Grignault), Coralie, 
 Publishers/Journalists/Critics: Finot, Etienne Lousteau, Felicien Vernou
 Money lenders: Jean-Esther van Gobseck, Bidault aka Gigonnet

Characters who appear in several titles but only significantly in one of them.
 Birotteau
 Goriot

Characters in a single volume
 Raphaël de Valentin
 le baron Hulot
 Balthazar Claës
 Grandet
 le cousin Pons

Heraldry

Balzac created fictional coats of arms for many of the characters in the novels. They have later been illustrated and collected in the Armorial de la Comédie Humaine (1963).

Lists of literary characters